is a town in Tochigi Prefecture, Japan. , the town had an estimated population of 15,661 in 5,658 households, and a population density of 220 persons per km2.
.

Geography
Haga is located in southeastern Tochigi Prefecture. The river Gogyō, a tributary of the river Kokaigawa flows through Haga.

Surrounding municipalities
Tochigi Prefecture
 Utsunomiya
 Mooka
 Ichikai
 Takanezawa

Demographics
Per Japanese census data, the population of Haga has declined in recent decades.

History
Ubagai, Minatakazeawa and Mizuhashi villages were created within Haga District on 1 April 1889 with the creation of the modern municipalities system. Ubagai was elevated to town status on 1 November 1928. Ubagai merged with Minatakanezawa and Mizuhashi to form Haga on 31 March 1954.

Government
Haga has a mayor-council form of government with a directly elected mayor and a unicameral town council of 13 members. Haga, together with the other municipalities in Haga District collectively contributes two members to the Tochigi Prefectural Assembly. In terms of national politics, the town is part of Tochigi 4th district of the lower house of the Diet of Japan.

Town Mayor: 見目匡 Tadashi Kenmoku (Eighth Mayor of Haga, Mayor since 18 May 2015)
Town Deputy Mayor: 上野哲男 Tetsuo Ueno (13th Deputy Mayor of Haga, Deputy Mayor since 15 June 2015)
Superintendent of Education: 見目政子 Masako Kenmoku (Seventh Superintendent of Education, Superintendent of Education since 1 November 2012)

Economy
Major companies located at Haga-machi industrial complex include:
Honda R&D Co., Ltd.
Honda Engineering Co., Ltd.
Kawasaki Microelectronics, Inc.
Showa Corporation
Marujun Co., Ltd.
F-Tech Inc.
Yanagawa Seiki Co., Ltd.
AutoTechnicJapan Co., Ltd.
Kandenko Co., Ltd.
Kotobukido
Sannotec

Education
Haga has three public primary schools and one public middle school operated by the town government. The town does not have a high school.

Transportation

Railway
Haga is currently not served by any passenger train service.  In 2023, it will become the eastern terminus of the Utsunomiya Light Rail.

Highway
 
Tochigi Prefectural Roads: 61, 64, 69, 154, 156, 165, 255, 388.
Roadside stations: Roadside Station Haga.

Buses
JR Bus Kantō: Sakushin Gakuin-mae – Twin Ring Motegi via Utsunomiya Station and Motegi Station, Sakushin Gakuin mae – Saga-Onsen Roman no Yu via Utsunomiya Station.

Heliports
Tochigi Heliport

Local attractions
 Haga Tenman-gu shrine

Notable people from Haga
Yukiko Akaba, long distance runner.

References

External links

Official Website  

Towns in Tochigi Prefecture
Haga, Tochigi